The Kayı or Kayi tribe (Middle Turkic: قَيِغْ  qayïγ or simply qayig;) were an Oghuz Turkic people and a sub-branch of the Bozok tribal federation. In his Dīwān Lughāt al-Turk, the 11th century Kara-Khanid scholar Mahmud al-Kashgari cited  as of one of 22 Oghuz tribes, saying that Oghuz were also called Turkomans. The name Kayı means "the one who has might and power by relationship" and the Turkmen proverb says that "people shall be led by Kayi and Bayat tribes".

Origin 
In his history work Shajara-i Tarākima, the Khan of Khiva and historian, Abu al-Ghazi Bahadur, mentions  among the 24 ancient Turkmen (Oghuz Turkic) tribes, direct descendants of Oghuz Khagan. Oghuz Khagan is a semi-legendary figure thought to be the ancient progenitor of Oghuz Turks.  translates as "strong". In his extensive history work “Jami' al-tawarikh” (Collection of Chronicles), the statesman and historian of the Ilkhanate Rashid-al-Din Hamadani also says that the  tribe comes from the oldest of Oghuz Khan's 24 grandchildren who were the patriarchs of the ancient Oghuz tribes, and the name Kayı  means "powerful".

Soviet Sinologist and Turkologist Yury Zuev based on the analysis of tribal names and tamgas from Tang Huiyao, identifies a number of ancient Central Asian Turkic tribes as Oghuz-Turkmen tribes, one of them is the Kay tribe, whom Chinese knew as Xí 奚 (< MC *γiei). After examining Chinese sources & consulting the works of other scholars (Pelliot, Minorsky), Zuev proposes that the Kay had belonged to the proto-Mongolic Xianbei tribal union Yuwen Xiongnu and that Kay had been ethnic and linguistic relatives of the Mongolic-speaking Khitans, prior to being known as an Oghuz-Turkmen tribe by the 9th century. Likewise, Hungarian scholar Gyula Németh (1969) links Kayı(ğ) to the (para-)Mongolic Qay/Xí, whom Tibetans knew as Dad-pyi and Göktürks knew as Tatabï; however, Németh's thesis is rejected by Mehmet Fuat Köprülü among others. Later on, Németh (1991) proposes that Mg. Qay is derived from Tk. root qað- "snowstorm, blizzard"; nevertheless, Golden points out that Qay has several Mongolic etymologies: ɣai "misfortune", χai "interjection of grief", χai "to seek", χai "to hew".

Even so, Köprülü rejects scholarly attempts to link the formerly Mongolic Qay/Xi to the Oghuz Turkic tribe Qayı(ğ); he points out that Kashgari's Dīwān Lughāt al-Turk distinguished the Qay tribe from the Qayığ branch/sub-tribe of the Oghuz-Turkmen tribe.

History 

According to Ottoman tradition, Osman I, the founder of Ottoman Empire, was a descendant of the Kayı tribe. This claim has, however, been called into serious question by many modern historians. The only evidence for the Ottomans' Kayı descent came from genealogies written during the fifteenth century, several centuries after the life of Osman. More significantly, the earliest genealogies written by the Ottomans did not include any reference to Kayı descent at all, indicating that it may have been fabricated at a later date.

The famous Oghuz-Turkic folk narrator, soothsayer and bard Gorkut-ata (Dede Korkut) belonged to the Kayı tribe. In the 10th century, the Central Asian Oghuz Yabgu State was headed by supreme leaders (or Yabghu) who belonged to the Kayi tribe.

According to Soviet archaeologist and ethnographer Sergey Tolstov, part of the Kayi tribe moved in the Middle Ages from Central Asia to modern day Ukraine, they are known in the Old Russian Chronicles as kovuy and kaepichi as one of the tribes that formed the Turkic tribal confederation called Chorni Klobuky (lit. "Black Hats") who were allies of the Rurikid khaganate of Kievan Rus; Golden however considers the Kaepichi to be descendants of the Mongolic or para-Mongolic Qay instead. According to the famous Soviet and Russian linguist and turkologist A. V. Superanskaya, the origin of the name of the city of Kiev is associated with the Kayı tribe: "As ethnographers testify, ethnically “pure” peoples do not and cannot exist. On the contrary, new peoples arise from ethnic mixes of two or more peoples, usually assimilating the best features of each. There are many folk legends that the beginning of a nation was laid by two (or several) brothers ... Apparently, something similar lies behind the legend of Kiy, Schek, Horev and Lybed. The tribal name Kyy (Kiy) belonged to the ancient Turkic peoples. It is still present in the names of tribal structures of modern Turkic peoples ”.

Legacy of the Kayi tribe 

In Turkmenistan, the  tribe is one of the main divisions of the Gekleng Turkmens living in the Balkan velayat and consists of the following clans:  and others. The  are also a subtribe of the Bayat Turkmens of the Lebap velayat.

Inspirations
The name and logo of the İyi Party (İyi means Good in Turkish) of Meral Akşener is inspired by the seal of the Kayı tribe.

See also
 Ottoman Dynasty
 Turkmen Tribes
 Oghuz traditional tribal organization
 Kaza-i Cuma (or Kayılar Kazası)
 Good Party

Notes

References

Sources
 Kafesoğlu, İbrahim. Türk Milli Kültürü. Türk Kültürünü Araştırma Enstitüsü, 1977. page 134
Gmyrya, L. 1995. "Hun country at the Caspian Gate: Caspian Dagestan during the epoch of the Great Movement of Peoples". Makhachkala: Dagestan Publishing

Ottoman dynasty
Oghuz tribes